Timothy Edward Butler (born March 13, 1991) is an American professional baseball pitcher for the Charleston Dirty Birds of the Atlantic League of Professional Baseball. He previously played in Major League Baseball (MLB) for the Colorado Rockies, Chicago Cubs, and Texas Rangers. He also played in the KBO League for the NC Dinos.

Amateur career
Butler attended Greenbrier Christian Academy in Chesapeake, Virginia. After playing for the school's baseball team, The Virginian-Pilot named him to their All-Tidewater team in 2009, his senior year. The Texas Rangers selected him in the 35th round of the 2009 Major League Baseball draft. He did not sign and attended Radford University, where he played college baseball for the Radford Highlanders. In his junior year, Butler pitched to a 7–4 win–loss record and a 2.20 earned run average (ERA). He won the Big South Conference Pitcher of the Year Award. In 2011, he played collegiate summer baseball with the Harwich Mariners of the Cape Cod Baseball League.

Professional career

Colorado Rockies
The Colorado Rockies selected Butler in the first round of the 2012 Major League Baseball draft. He signed with the Rockies, receiving a $1 million signing bonus. Butler made his professional debut with the Grand Junction Rockies of the Rookie-level Pioneer League, and was named an All-Star after going 7–1 with a 2.13 ERA and 55 strikeouts. Butler began the 2013 season with the Asheville Tourists of the Class A South Atlantic League, but after making nine starts for Asheville, he was promoted to the Modesto Nuts of the Class A-Advanced California League. He was named to appear in the 2013 All-Star Futures Game, where he pitched an inning without allowing a run. Butler made six starts for the Tulsa Drillers of the Class AA Texas League to conclude the season.

The Rockies invited Butler to spring training in 2014.  They assigned him to Tulsa to start the 2014 season, and he started Tulsa's season opener. After he pitched to a 2.49 ERA with 40 strikeouts and 19 walks in  innings pitched, the Rockies promoted Butler to the major leagues for his debut on June 6. He recorded a loss in his first start, pitching 5innings and giving up 6 runs on 10 hits. He was placed on the disabled-list before his next scheduled start with right shoulder inflammation, and he was replaced by Tyler Matzek, who would be the third starting pitcher to debut for the Rockies in six days, along with Butler and Christian Bergman.

Butler won the fifth starter's spot out of Spring Training in 2015. Butler struggled mightily at the beginning, inducing 30 walks while striking out just 29 in  innings. He was demoted at the end of May to AAA. Butler was once again called up, he finished the season with a 3–10 record along with an ERA of 5.90 in 16 games started. He also had his first complete game of his career. Right-handed batters had a higher batting average against him, .340, than against all other MLB pitchers in 30 or more innings.

Butler finished the 2016 season 2–5 with a 7.17 ERA. On January 28, 2017, Butler was designated for assignment.

Chicago Cubs
On February 1, 2017, Butler was traded to the Chicago Cubs for James Farris. He made his Cubs debut on May 12 and pitched 6 shutout innings in a 3–2 victory over the Cardinals.  Butler spent time in the Cubs rotation and in the AAA level, appearing in 13 games for the Cubs, 11 of them starts. In  innings, Butler was 4–3 with a 3.95 ERA. The following season, Butler began the 2018 season in the Cubs bullpen before being placed on the 60 day disabled list.

Texas Rangers
On July 27, 2018, Butler (along with Rollie Lacy and Alexander Ovalles) was traded to the Texas Rangers in exchange for Cole Hamels. In 22 appearances, he pitched to a 6.47 ERA in 32 innings while going 2/2 in save opportunities. He elected free agency on November 21, 2018.

NC Dinos
On December 3, 2018, Butler signed a one-year, $800,000 contract with the NC Dinos of the KBO League. He was waived on July 3, 2019, after pitching to a 3–6 record with a 4.76 ERA in 13 starts.

Chicago Dogs
On June 17, 2020, Butler signed with the Chicago Dogs of the American Association. On November 12, 2020, Butler was released by the Dogs.

Kansas City Royals
On May 4, 2021, Butler signed with the Southern Maryland Blue Crabs of the Atlantic League of Professional Baseball. However, the next day, the Kansas City Royals organization purchased Butler's contract and assigned him to the Triple-A Omaha Storm Chasers. Butler made 27 appearances for Omaha, going 7–3 with a 6.01 ERA and 55 strikeouts. On September 8, 2021, the Royals released Butler.

Southern Maryland Blue Crabs
On April 13, 2022, Butler signed with the Southern Maryland Blue Crabs of the Atlantic League of Professional Baseball. Butler started 26 games for the Blue Crabs in 2022, posting a 12–6 record and 4.94 ERA with 94 strikeouts in 155.0 innings pitched.

Charleston Dirty Birds
On January 27, 2023, Butler was traded to the Charleston Dirty Birds of the Atlantic League of Professional Baseball in exchange for infielder Jose Rosario.

References

External links

Radford Highlanders bio

1991 births
Living people
Sportspeople from Chesapeake, Virginia
Major League Baseball pitchers
Baseball players from Virginia
Colorado Rockies players
Chicago Cubs players
Texas Rangers players
Radford Highlanders baseball players
Harwich Mariners players
Grand Junction Rockies players
Asheville Tourists players
Modesto Nuts players
Tulsa Drillers players
Colorado Springs Sky Sox players
Albuquerque Isotopes players
Iowa Cubs players
NC Dinos players
KBO League pitchers
American expatriate baseball players in South Korea
Chicago Dogs players
Omaha Storm Chasers players
Southern Maryland Blue Crabs players